Takahiro Okada (岡田 貴弘, born February 9, 1988, in Suita) is a Japanese professional baseball outfielder and first baseman for the Orix Buffaloes in Japan's Nippon Professional Baseball.

His playing name was changed to T-Okada(T-岡田) in 2009, as to prevent name confusion to the new manager Akinobu Okada, which the following season he finished top in home runs.

External links

NPB

1988 births
Living people
People from Suita
Japanese baseball players
Orix Buffaloes players
Baseball people from Osaka Prefecture